The Anchoress is a historical fiction novel by Robyn Cadwallader published by Sarah Crichton Books in 2015. The plot is set in the 13th-century England.

References 

Historical novels
2015 Australian novels
Novels set in the 13th century
Sarah Crichton Books books